Felix Faubert-Lussier (born October 14, 1991) is a former professional Canadian football wide receiver who played for three seasons in the Canadian Football League (CFL). He played U Sports football with the Laval Rouge et Or from 2012 to 2016, where he was part of three Vanier Cup winning teams.

Professional career

Hamilton Tiger-Cats
Faubert-Lussier was drafted in the fifth round, 39th overall by the Hamilton Tiger-Cats in the 2016 CFL Draft and he signed with the team on May 27, 2016. He spent time on the team's practice roster, but was released on August 17, 2016 to return to play for Laval. He re-signed with the Tiger-Cats for the 2017 season and played in 14 regular season games, starting four. He had three catches for 29 yards that year while also serving as emergency punter and kicker, recording four punts for a 43.3-yard average and two kickoffs for a 55.5-yard average. He played in 13 games in 2018, starting two, and recorded 11 catches for 74 yards. He became a free agent on February 12, 2019.

Montreal Alouettes
On February 20, 2019, Faubert-Lussier signed with his hometown Montreal Alouettes to a one-year contract. He played in two games in 2019 before being released on July 8, 2019. However, on July 16, 2019, Faubert-Lussier re-signed with the Alouettes. Overall in 2019, he played in nine regular season games and had nine receptions for 102 yards. 

Faubert-Lussier re-signed with the Alouettes on January 20, 2021. However, he later announced his retirement on July 6, 2021.

References

External links
 Montreal Alouettes bio

1991 births
Living people
Canadian football wide receivers
Hamilton Tiger-Cats players
Laval Rouge et Or football players
Montreal Alouettes players
Players of Canadian football from Quebec
Canadian football people from Montreal